The 1837 Alabama gubernatorial election was an election held on August 7, 1837, to elect the governor of Alabama. Democratic candidate Arthur P. Bagby beat Anti-Van Buren candidate Samuel W. Oliver with 45.21% of the vote.

General election

Candidates
Arthur P. Bagby, Member of the Alabama House of Representatives 1834–1836.
Samuel W. Oliver, Member of the Alabama House of Representatives, Speaker of the House 1832–1835.

Results

References

Alabama gubernatorial elections
Alabama
1837 Alabama elections
August 1837 events